This page shows the results of the Gymnastics Competition at the 2003 Pan American Games, held from August 2 to August 5 in Santo Domingo, Dominican Republic.

Medal table

Artistic gymnastics

Men's competition

All-around

Floor exercise

Parallel bars

Pommel horse

Rings

Horizontal bar

Vault

Team

Women's competition

All-around

Floor exercise

Uneven bars

Balance beam

Vault
Held on 2003-08-05

Team
Held on 2003-08-02

Rhythmic gymnastics

Women's competition

Individual all-around

Hoop

Ball

Clubs

Ribbon

Group all-around

Group ribbon

Group hoop-ball

See also
Pan American Gymnastics Championships
South American Gymnastics Championships
Gymnastics at the 2004 Summer Olympics

References
 Sports 123
 Results
 cbc
 Folha Online (Portuguese)

P
2003
Events at the 2003 Pan American Games